This list includes Conservation Areas, Wildlife Areas, and other natural places administered under the central administrative region of the Missouri Department of Conservation, including those administered under cooperative agreements with local counties and municipalities.

The Central administrative region of the Missouri Department of Conservation consists of Audrain, Boone, Callaway, Camden, Cole, Cooper, Gasconade, Howard, Maries, Miller, Montgomery, Moniteau, Morgan, Osage, and Saline counties.  The regional conservation office is in Columbia.

Notes 

 Acreage and counties from MDCLand GIS file
 Names, descriptions, and locations from Conservation Atlas Online GIS file

References 

Conservation Areas of Missouri